Year 666 (DCLXVI) was a common year starting on Thursday (link will display the full calendar) of the Julian calendar. The denomination 666 for this year has been used since the early medieval period, when the Anno Domini calendar era became the prevalent method in Europe for naming years.

Events 
 By place 

 Byzantine Empire 
 Emperor Constans II grants the request of Bishop Maurus of Ravenna, allowing the city to consecrate its bishop without approval from Rome (approximate date).

 Europe 
 Duke Lupus of Friuli revolts against King Grimoald I, with allied Avars. Grimoald takes and devastates Friuli, tracks down Lupus's son Arnefrit (allied with the Slaves), and beats him and kills him in battle at the castle of Nimis. Grimoald appoints Wechtar as the new duke of Friuli.

 Asia 
 Chinese Buddhist monks Zhi Yu and Zhi Yuo craft more south-pointing chariot vehicles (a non-magnetic, mechanical-driven directional-compass vehicle that incorporates the use of a Differential.

Religion
 Wilfrid returns to Great Britain, but is shipwrecked in Sussex. When he finally reaches Northumbria, he finds he has been deposed and is forced to retire to Ripon.
 Earconwald, Anglo-Saxon abbot, establishes the Benedictine abbeys, Chertsey Abbey (Surrey) for men  and Barking Abbey (now in east London) for women.

Births 
 Zhang Jiazhen, Chinese official

Deaths 
 Abdul-Rahman ibn Abi Bakr, first child of first Rashidun caliph, Abu Bakr As-Siddiq
 Arnefrit, duke of Friuli (Northern Italy)
 Liu Xiangdao, official of the Tang Dynasty (b. 596)
 Ramla bint Abi Sufyan, a wife of Muhammad

References